Mangrovimonas yunxiaonensis is a Gram-negative and short-rod-shaped bacterium from the genus of Mangrovimonas which has been isolated from mangrove sediments from the Yunxiao mangrove National Nature Reserve in China.

References

Flavobacteria
Bacteria described in 2013